Syed Basharat Ahmad Bukhari is a broadcaster and the former minister for Law, Justice, Revenue, Parliamentary affairs, Horticulture, Disaster Management, Relief, Rehabilitation and Reconstruction of Jammu and Kashmir State(Erstwhile), India. He is currently Vice President and Media Head of Jammu and Kashmir People’s Conference a political party based in Jammu and Kashmir. He served as member of Legislative Council and member of Legislative Assembly from Sangrama segment

See also 
 Shujaat Bukhari

References

External links 
Syed Basharat Ahmed Bukhari affidavit

Living people
Jammu and Kashmir Peoples Democratic Party politicians
People from Baramulla district
1962 births
Jammu and Kashmir People's Conference politicians
Jammu and Kashmir MLAs 2008–2014
Jammu and Kashmir MLAs 2014–2018